Persicaria bicornis is a North American species of flowering plant in the buckwheat family (Polygonaceae). The common name is pink smartweed. It is native to the central and southwestern United States from northern Texas west to Arizona, east to Louisiana, and north as far as eastern Wyoming, South Dakota, Iowa, and Illinois.

Description
Its pink flowers contain 6-8 stamens with pink or red anthers. These flowers contain 1 compound pistil with 2-3 styles coming out of the base of the flower. The blooms appear to be fringed, and its heterostylous flowers are positioned very closely together. Persicaria bicornis has leaf blades that are more narrow than P. pensylvanica, which helps to distinguish the two.

Distribution and habitat
This species can be found in North America: Arkansas, Colorado, Illinois, Louisiana, Missouri, and Texas amongst other places. It can be found in disturbed places such as moist ditches, and on the shorelines of ponds and reservoirs.  Persicaria bicornis typically grows from June to October.

Uses
There are currently no known human uses for this particular species.

References

External links

bicornis
Flora of the United States
Plants described in 1817